Jazak is a village in Serbia. It is located in the Irig municipality, in the region of Syrmia (Syrmia District), Vojvodina province. The population of the village numbering 1,100 people (2002 census), of whom 1,045 are ethnic Serbs.

Historical population

Notable residents
Teodor Avramović, the leader of the rebellion of the Syrmian peasants, which was known as the Tican's Rebellion.

Church of St. Nicholas
The Serbian Orthodox Church of St. Nicholas dates back to the 18th century. The ornamental church work is attributed to engraver Marko Vujatović.

Family names of the villagers

Some of the prominent families in the village include: Božić, Goljevački, Grujić, Ilić, Janković, Jankulović, Jerkić, Jocić, Jovanović, Kostić, Majstorović, Maletić, Marić, Marojević, Mirković, Čavić, Mihajlović, Mladenović, Mojsilović, Nedić, Nenadović, Nešković, Petaković, Popović, Radojčić, Radonić, Savić, Stanišić, Slavnić, Tešić, Utvić, Vukmirović, Živanović, etc.

See also
Jazak monastery
List of places in Serbia
List of cities, towns and villages in Vojvodina

References

Slobodan Ćurčić, Broj stanovnika Vojvodine, Novi Sad, 1996.

Populated places in Syrmia